René Pinchart (24 June 1891 – 2 November 1970) was a Belgian gymnast. He competed in the men's team, Swedish system event at the 1920 Summer Olympics, winning the bronze medal.

References

External links
 

1891 births
1970 deaths
Belgian male artistic gymnasts
Olympic gymnasts of Belgium
Gymnasts at the 1920 Summer Olympics
Olympic bronze medalists for Belgium
Medalists at the 1920 Summer Olympics
Olympic medalists in gymnastics
People from Maldegem
Sportspeople from East Flanders